Broken Blossom is the fourth studio album by American singer Bette Midler, her second album release in 1977 and her fifth on the Atlantic Records label. Just as Midler's three previous studio albums Broken Blossom includes songs from a wide variety of genres, ranging from Edith Piaf's signature tune "La vie en rose", Phil Spector-esque covers of Billy Joel's "Say Goodbye to Hollywood" and Harry Nilsson's "Paradise" and hard rock like Sammy Hagar's "Red", to a jazzy duet with Tom Waits, "I Never Talk to Strangers", and a rendition of "A Dream Is a Wish Your Heart Makes", originally from Walt Disney's 1950 film version of Cinderella. The album reached #51 on Billboards album chart.

The album was released on CD for the first time in 1993. A remastered version of the album was released by Atlantic Records/Warner Music in 1995.

Track listingSide A:"Make Yourself Comfortable"  (Bob Merrill) - 3:59
"You Don't Know Me" (Eddy Arnold, Cindy Walker) - 3:39
"Say Goodbye to Hollywood" (Billy Joel) - 3:02
"I Never Talk To Strangers" (duet with Tom Waits) (Tom Waits) - 3:39
"Daybreak (Storybook Children)" (David Pomeranz, Spencer Proffer) - 3:40
"Red" (John Carter, Sammy Hagar) - 3:17Side B:'
"Empty Bed Blues" (J. C. Johnson) - 3:19
"A Dream Is a Wish Your Heart Makes" (Mack David) - 3:09
"Paradise" (Perry Botkin, Jr., Gil Garfield, Harry Nilsson) - 4:15
"Yellow Beach Umbrella" (Craig Doerge, Judy Henske) - 4:24
"La Vie en Rose" (Mack David, Louiguy, Edith Piaf) - 2:59

Personnel

 Bette Midler – lead vocals all tracks, background vocals tracks A3, B3, all background vocals track B4
 Craig Doerge – keyboards tracks A1, B4, piano track A2
 Russ Kunkel – drums tracks A1, A2
 Alan Estes – congas track A1, percussion tracks A5, B3, B4
 Lee Ritenour – electric guitar tracks A1, A2, A3, B3
 Leland Sklar – bass guitar tracks A1, A2
 Jim Horn – baritone sax track A1
 Donny Gerrard – background vocals track A1
 Brian Russell – background vocals tracks A1, A3
 Chuck Higgins – background vocals track A1
 Jimmie Haskell – arranger strings & horns track A2
 Brenda Russell – background vocals tracks A2, A3, A5
 Clydie King – background vocals tracks A2, A3, A5
 Diane Brooks – background vocals tracks A2, A3, A5
 Bobby Rozario – musical arranger track A3
 Artie Butler – piano tracks A3, A5 B3, arranger tracks A5, B2, B3, arranger strings and horns track B4, arranger strings track B5
 Jim Keltner – drums tracks A3, A5, A6, B1, B3, B4
 Jack Jennings - percussion instruments track A3
 Chuck Rainey – bass track A3
 David Latman – background vocals track A3
 Bob Alcivar – arranger track A4
 Tom Waits – lead vocals, piano track A4
 Frank Vicari – tenor saxophone solo track A4
 Jim Hughart – bass tracks A4, A5, B5
 Shelly Manne – drums track A4
 Thom Rotella – guitar tracks A5, B3
 Ira Newborn – arranger tracks A6, B1, guitars track A6
 Don Randi – keyboards track A6, organ track B1
 Fred Tackett – guitars tracks A6, B1
 Jerry Scheff – bass tracks A6, B1
 Steve Porcaro – synthesizers track A6
 John Barnes – piano track B1
 David Walker – electric guitars track B1
 Steve Douglas – saxophone track B1
 Plas Johnson – saxophone track B1
 Don Menza – saxophone track B1
 Marshall Royal – saxophone track B1
 Gene Goe – trumpet track B1
 Don Rader – trumpet track B1
 Bobby Shaw – trumpet track B1
 Lew McCreary – bones track B1
 Bill Watrous – bones track B1
 David Hungate – bass track B3
 Ellie Greenwich – background vocals track B3
 Mikie Harris – background vocals track B3
 Howard Roberts – guitar and ukulele track B4
 Max Bennett – bass track B4
 Mike Melvoin – arranger & piano track B5

Production
 Brooks Arthur - record producer, sound engineer
 Bob Merritt - sound engineer
 David Latman - assistant sound engineer
 Ivy Skoff - production coordinator
 Bones Howe - producer track A4 for Mr. Bones Production
 Management: Aaron Russo, Hollywood, California
 Bob Defrin - cover design
 George Hurrell - photography:
 Primary recording location: The Record Plant, Los Angeles. Additional recording at Studio 55, Los Angeles.

Charts

References

Bette Midler albums
1977 albums
Atlantic Records albums
Albums arranged by Jimmie Haskell
Albums produced by Brooks Arthur